In commutative algebra, the Auslander–Buchsbaum formula, introduced by ,  states that if R is a commutative Noetherian local ring and M is a non-zero finitely generated R-module of finite projective dimension, then:

 

Here pd stands for the projective dimension of a module, and depth for the depth of a module.

Applications

The Auslander–Buchsbaum formula implies that a Noetherian local ring is regular if, and only if, it has finite global dimension. In turn this implies that the localization of a regular local ring is regular.

If A is a local finitely generated R-algebra (over a regular local ring R), then the Auslander–Buchsbaum formula implies that A is Cohen–Macaulay if, and only if, pdRA = codimRA.

References

Chapter 19 of 

Commutative algebra
Theorems in ring theory